Monica Niculescu and Klára Koukalová were the defending champions, but Koukalová chose not to participate.  Niculescu played alongside Zarina Diyas, but they lost in the first round to Lyudmyla Kichenok and Nadiia Kichenok.
The Kichenok sisters went on to win the title, defeating Liang Chen and Wang Yafan in the final, 6-4, 7-6(8-6).

Seeds

Draw

Draw

References
 Main Draw

WTA Shenzhen Open - Doubles
2015 Doubles